Alexandra Rexová (born 5 August 2005) is a Slovak visually impaired para alpine skier who competed at the 2022 Winter Paralympics.

Career
Rexová represented Slovakia at the 2022 Winter Paralympics and won a gold medal in the Super-G, and a bronze medal in the slalom.

References 

Living people
Slovak female alpine skiers
Alpine skiers at the 2022 Winter Paralympics
Medalists at the 2022 Winter Paralympics
Paralympic gold medalists for Slovakia
Paralympic bronze medalists for Slovakia
Paralympic medalists in alpine skiing
2005 births
Sportspeople from Bratislava